Legion of Lost Flyers (aka Legion of Lost Fliers) is a 1939 American B movie drama film directed by Christy Cabanne. It stars Richard Arlen, Andy Devine, and Anne Nagel. Legion of Lost Flyers was released by Universal Pictures on November 3, 1939.

Plot
A group of pilots, because of unsavory or unearned reputations, establish an outpost of their own, running charter-flights and hauling supplies in the frozen wastelands of Alaska. Gene "Loop" Gillian (Richard Arlen), Gillian came to Alaska because he has been blamed for a crash where four men where killed. Bill Desert (Theodore Von Eltz), the head of the commercial airlines, refuses to hire him as a pilot, but at the request of aircraft mechanic "Beef" Brumley (Andy Devine), Desert hires Loop as a "grease jockey".

Brumley knows Gillian and does not believe the story about the deaths. Regarded as a coward by the other pilots, Ralph Perry (William Lundigan), Jake Halley (Guinn "Big Boy" Williams) and Smythe  (Leon Ames), Gillian claims he is innocent of causing the deaths because it was really Perry who had taken the flight that night. Rumours continue to swirl about the incident.

Perry decides he has had enough and takes off in an stolen aircraft loaded with gold from a local mine. He ends up crashing in the wilderness in a remote canyon, with Gillian, the only one willing to fly to his rescue. After loading Perry on board, the take off ends in the aircraft suffering heavy damage.

On the return flight, the aircraft is falling to pieces. Perry panics and as Gillian nears the airfield, he forces Perry to confess on the radio about his involvement in the men's death. Gillian is reinstated as a pilot and falls in love with Paula (Anne Nagel) who had been the boss's sweetheart.

Cast

 Richard Arlen as Gene "Loop" Gillan
 Andy Devine as "Beef" Brumley
 Anne Nagel as Paula
 William Lundigan as Ralph Perry
 Guinn "Big Boy" Williams as Jake Halley
 Ona Munson as Martha
 Jerry Marlowe as Freddy Sims
 Leon Ames as Smythe
 Theodore Von Eltz as Bill Desert
 Leon Belasco as Frenchy
 Dave Willock as Blinky, the Radioman
 Jack Carson as Larry Barrigan
 Edith Mills as Bertha the Eskimo
 Pat Flaherty as Sam Bradford
 Eddy Waller as Petey

Production
Production dates for principal photography for Legion of Lost Flyers began on July 26, 1939.

The aircraft used in Legion of Lost Flyers was: 
 Stearman C3B 
 Fleet 1 c/n 374, NC792V 
 Fokker F.10
 Travel Air 2000 NC446W

Reception
Frank Nugent in his film review for The New York Times described the film as "You've seen all this before in your Class "C" dreams: Shacklike hangar, old crates to fly, mountainous terrain, handful of desperate crag-hoppers and so on. But this one has some new features which we'll wager you had never visualized as possibilities: for one, Richard Arlen wasn't the man who violated the code by bailing out of that big transport, leaving his passengers to perish, though how the guilty pilot was substituted in midair is not explained. For another, Mr. Arlen thrice performs the impossible: (1) lands his plane safely in a snow-clogged canyon, (2) takes off again without landing gear in spite of stumps, boulders and underbrush, and (3) after his plane has lost a wing and he himself has been concussively conked by his enemy, who does another bailout, what do you think becomes of Mr. Arlen? Well, sir, the broken plane crashes in a skidding, sickening heap on a convenient modern landing field, with streamlined ambulance service, and Mr. Arlen emerges from the wreckage with nothing worse than a bandage bound picturesquely around his brow."

References

Notes

Citations

Bibliography

 Farmer, James H. Celluloid Wings: The Impact of Movies on Aviation. Blue Ridge Summit, Pennsylvania: Tab Books Inc., 1984. .
 Pendo, Stephen. Aviation in the Cinema. Lanham, Maryland: Scarecrow Press, 1985. .
 Wynne, H. Hugh. The Motion Picture Stunt Pilots and Hollywood's Classic Aviation Movies. Missoula, Montana: Pictorial Histories Publishing Co., 1987. .

External links

Films directed by Christy Cabanne
American aviation films
1939 drama films
1939 films
American drama films
Universal Pictures films
American black-and-white films
Films scored by Hans J. Salter
1930s American films